The Șicasău is a left tributary of the river Târnava Mare in Romania. It discharges into the Zetea Reservoir (also: Lake Poiana Târnavei), which is drained by the Târnava Mare.

References

Rivers of Romania
Rivers of Harghita County